This is a comprehensive list of victories of the  cycling team formerly known as Bretagne–Jean Floc'h, Bretagne–Armor Lux, Bretagne–Schuller, Bretagne–Séché Environnement, Fortuneo–Vital Concept, Fortuneo–Oscaro and Fortuneo–Samsic. The races are categorized according to the UCI Continental Circuits rules. The team was in the UCI Continental category from 2005 to 2010 then up to UCI Professional Continental from 2011 till present.

2005 – Bretagne–Jean Floc'h

 Stage 3 Tour de Normandie, Stéphane Pétilleau
 Overall Ruban Granitier Breton, Stéphane Pétilleau
Stage 2, Stéphane Pétilleau
Stage 5, Charles Guilbert
 Overall Tour de Gironde, Charles Guilbert
Stage 1, Charles Guilbert
 Stage 2 Route du Sud, Stéphane Pétilleau
 Stage 3 Boucles de la Mayenne, Charles Guilbert
 Overall Tour de l'Ain, Carl Naibo
Stage 3, Carl Naibo
Stage 4, Samuel Plouhinec
 Stage 9 Tour de l'Avenir, Carl Naibo

2006 – Bretagne–Jean Floc'h

 Stage 4 Étoile des Bèsseges, Stéphane Pétilleau
 Stage 8 Tour de Normandie, Stéphane Pétilleau
 Stage 1 Tour de Bretagne, David Lelay
 Grand Prix de Plumelec-Morbihan, Cédric Hervé
 Stage 2 Boucles de la Mayenne, David Lelay
 Stage 3 Tour de l'Ain, Noan Lelarge
 Stage 2 Tour du Limousin, Noan Lelarge
 Stage 2 Tour de la Somme, Noan Lelarge
 Stage 3 Tour du Faso, Jean-Luc Delpech
 Stage 4 & 9 Tour du Faso, Stéphane Bonsergent

2007 – Bretagne–Armor Lux

 Stage 5 Tour de Normandie, Noan Lelarge
 Stage 2 Four Days of Dunkirk, Piotr Zieliński
 Polymultipliée Lyonnaise, Noan Lelarge

2008 – Bretagne–Armor Lux

 Stage 2 La Tropicale Amissa Bongo, Stéphane Bonsergent
 Stage 5 La Tropicale Amissa Bongo, Jean-Luc Delpech
 Paris–Troyes, Jean-Luc Delpech
 Overall Tour de Normandie, Antoine Dalibard
 Tour du Finistère, David Lelay
 Overall Tour de Bretagne, Benoît Poilvet
Stage 5, Benoît Poilvet
 Trophée des Grimpeurs, David Lelay
 Stage 1 Boucles de la Mayenne, Piotr Zieliński
 Stage 2 Route du Sud, Noan Lelarge
 Stage 2 Kreiz Breizh Elites, Cyril Gautier

2009 – Bretagne–Schuller

 Overall Circuit des Ardennes, Dimitri Champion
 Tour du Finistère, Dimitri Champion
 Stage 3 Four Days of Dunkirk, Sébastien Duret
  Road Race Championship, Dimitri Champion
 Overall Kreiz Breizh Elites, Antoine Dalibard
Stage 1, Dimitri Champion
Stage 3, Jean-Marc Bideau

2010 – Bretagne–Schuller

 Stage 7 Tour de Normandie, Laurent Pichon
 Stage 3b Circuit des Ardennes, Florian Vachon
 Tour du Finistère, Florian Vachon
 Stage 7 Tour de Bretagne, Gaël Malacarne
 Stage 2 Rhône-Alpes Isère Tour, Sébastien Duret
 Boucles de l'Aulne, Jean-Luc Delpech
 Stage 2 Circuito Montañés, Noan Lelarge
 Stage 3 Circuito Montañés, Lilian Jégou
 Stage 5 Circuito Montañés, Gaël Malacarne
 Stage 1 Route du Sud, Florian Vachon
 Stage 3 Boucles de la Mayenne, Jean-Luc Delpech
 Overall Kreiz Breizh Elites, Johan Le Bon
Stage 3, Johan Le Bon
 Overall Mi-Août Bretonne, Jean-Luc Delpech

2011 – Bretagne–Schuller

 Stage 3 Tour de Normandie, Guillaume Blot
 Stage 5 Tour de Normandie, Jean-Marc Bideau
 Route Adélie de Vitré, Renaud Dion
 Stage 3b Circuit des Ardennes, Laurent Pichon
 Stage 1 Boucles de la Mayenne, Éric Berthou
 Overall Kreiz Breizh Elites, Laurent Pichon
 Grand Prix de Fourmies, Guillaume Blot

2012 – Bretagne–Schuller

 Stage 1 Tour du Haut Var, Romain Hardy
 Paris–Troyes, Jean-Marc Bideau
 Classic Loire Atlantique, Florian Vachon
 Stage 6 Tour de Normandie, Jean-Marc Bideau
 Stage 1 Critérium International, Florian Vachon
 Val d'Ille U Classic 35, Éric Berthou
 Stage 2 Tour de Bretagne, Éric Berthou
 Overall Ronde de l'Oise, Jean-Luc Delpech
Stage 4, Jean-Luc Delpech
 Overall Boucles de la Mayenne, Laurent Pichon
 Paris–Bourges, Florian Vachon

2013 – Bretagne–Séché Environnement

 Paris–Troyes, Jean-Marc Bideau
 Stage 7 Tour de Bretagne, Pierre-Luc Périchon
 Stage 3 Kreiz Breizh Elites, Erwann Corbel
 Stage 2 Tour du Gévaudan, Sébastien Duret

2014 – Bretagne–Séché Environnement

 Classic Sud-Ardèche, Florian Vachon
 Stage 6 Tour de Normandie, Benoît Jarrier
 Stage 1 Ronde de l'Oise, Romain Feillu
 Stage 1 Boucles de la Mayenne, Armindo Fonseca
 Tour du Jura, Kevin Ledanois
 Tour de Vendée, Armindo Fonseca

2015 – Bretagne–Séché Environnement

 Stage 3 La Tropicale Amissa Bongo, Daniel McLay
 Stages 5, 7 & 8 La Tropicale Amissa Bongo, Yauheni Hutarovich
 Classic Sud-Ardèche, Eduardo Sepúlveda
 Cholet-Pays de Loire, Pierrick Fédrigo
 Route Adélie, Romain Feillu
 Stage 1 Tour du Poitou-Charentes, Arnaud Gérard
 Tour du Doubs, Eduardo Sepúlveda

2016 – Fortuneo–Vital Concept

 Stage 4 Tour de San Luis, Eduardo Sepúlveda
 Stage 7 La Tropicale Amissa Bongo, Yauheni Hutarovich
 GP de Denain, Daniel McLay
 Stages 2 & 5 Le Tour de Bretagne Cycliste trophée harmonie Mutuelle, Boris Vallée
 Grand Prix de la Somme, Daniel McLay
 Stage 3 Ronde de l'Oise, Boris Vallée
 Stage 3 Tour de Savoie Mont Blanc, Pierre-Luc Périchon

2017 – Fortuneo–Vital Concept/Fortuneo–Oscaro

 Trofeo Playa de Palma, Daniel McLay
 Classic Loire Atlantique, Laurent Pichon
 Overall Tour de Normandie, Anthony Delaplace
Stage 1, Anthony Delaplace
 Stage 1a Settimana Internazionale di Coppi e Bartali, Laurent Pichon
 Route Adélie de Vitré, Laurent Pichon

2018 – Fortuneo–Samsic

 Stage 1 Tour de Savoie Mont Blanc, Maxime Bouet
 La Poly Normande, Pierre-Luc Perichon

2019 – Arkéa–Samsic

 Stage 6 La Tropicale Amissa Bongo, André Greipel
 Overall Vuelta Ciclista Comunidad de Madrid, Clément Russo
Stage 3 Maxime Daniel
 Stage 1 Le Tour de Savoie Mont Blanc, Romain Hardy
  Road Race Championship, Warren Barguil

2020 – Arkéa–Samsic

 Stage 4 Tour of Saudi Arabia, Nacer Bouhanni
  Overall Tour de la Provence, Nairo Quintana
Stage 1, Nacer Bouhanni
Stage 3, Nairo Quintana
  Overall Tour du Haut Var, Nairo Quintana
Stage 2, Nairo Quintana
 Grand Prix de la Ville de Lillers, Florian Vachon
 Stage 7 Paris–Nice, Nairo Quintana
Grand Prix d'Isbergues, Nacer Bouhanni
Paris-Chauny, Nacer Bouhanni
Stages 5 & 6 Volta a Portugal, Daniel McLay

2021 – Arkéa–Samsic

 Overall Vuelta Asturias, Nairo Quintana
Stage 1, Nairo Quintana
Stage 5 Volta ao Algarve, Élie Gesbert
Trofeo Andratx – Mirador d'Es Colomer, Winner Anacona
Tro-Bro Léon, Connor Swift
Vuelta a Castilla y León, Matis Louvel
 Overall Tour du Limousin, Warren Barguil
 Overall Tour Poitou-Charentes en Nouvelle-Aquitaine, Connor Swift
Classic Loire Atlantique, Alan Riou
Tour de Vendée, Bram Welten

2022 – Arkéa–Samsic

Grand Prix La Marseillaise, Amaury Capiot
 Overall Tour de la Provence, Nairo Quintana
Stage 3, Nairo Quintana
 Overall Tour des Alpes-Maritimes et du Var, Nairo Quintana
Stage 3, Nairo Quintana
Stage 5 Tirreno–Adriatico, Warren Barguil
La Roue Tourangelle, Nacer Bouhanni
GP Miguel Induráin, Warren Barguil
Paris–Camembert, Anthony Delaplace
Tro-Bro Léon, Hugo Hofstetter
Stage 3 Boucles de la Mayenne, Amaury Capiot
Druivenkoers Overijse, Matis Louvel

2023 – Arkéa–Samsic

Muscat Classic, Jenthe Biermans
Stage 1 Tour des Alpes-Maritimes et du Var, Kévin Vauquelin

Supplementary statistics
Sources

References

External links

Arkéa–Samsic
Bretagne